Jürgen Gredig (born 19 January 1966 in West Berlin) is a retired German football defender.

References

External links 
 
 Jürgen Gredig at FC Schalke 04 

1966 births
Living people
Footballers from Berlin
German footballers
Association football defenders
Bundesliga players
Hertha Zehlendorf players
VfL Bochum players
FC Schalke 04 players
Rot Weiss Ahlen players